Tim Rerimassie (born 1 September 1996) is a Dutch football player who plays for RKSV Nuenen.

Club career
He made his professional debut in the Eerste Divisie for Helmond Sport on 14 March 2016 in a game against Jong PSV.

References

External links
 
 

1996 births
People from Nuenen, Gerwen en Nederwetten
Living people
Dutch footballers
Helmond Sport players
Eerste Divisie players
Association football defenders
RKSV Nuenen players
Footballers from North Brabant